The 1521 Santo Domingo Slave Revolt in the Spanish colony of Santo Domingo on the island of Hispaniola took place around the time of Christmas festivities in 1521. It is the earliest recorded slave rebellion in the Americas. Just days after the rebellion, the colonial authorities introduced a set of laws to prevent another uprising. These are thought to be the earliest surviving laws created to control enslaved Africans in the New World. 

There is some disagreement by historians on the precise date of the rebellion. Some historical sources state the rebellion took place on the first or second day of Christmas. Contemporary historians generally mark the anniversary of the rebellion as December 25th or 26th, other sources mistakenly call it the "1522 slave rebellion". 

The rebellion started on the Nueva Isabela sugar plantation (located today in the northwestern outskirts of Santo Domingo city) owned by the colony's governor Diego Colón, a descendant of Chistopher Columbus. The text of 1522 slave laws describe that a "certain number" of slaves "agreed to rebel and rebelled with intention and purpose to kill all the Christians they could and to free themselves and take over the land." The historical documents present the uprising as well-planned and coordinated action. Local oral tradition says that the rebellion was led by Maria Olofa (Wolofa) and Gonzalo Mandinga, a romantic couple, both Muslims from the Wolof nation. 

On January 6 of 1522 (Day of the Three Kings also known as Ephiphany), just days after the uprising, the governor of Santo Domingo, introduced strict laws designed to prevent the "Black and slaves" from uprising again. These are thought to be some of the earliest laws created to control enslaved Africans in the New World. The 1522 laws restricted the physical movements of the enslaved, prohibited the enslaved from bearing arms and accessing weapons, required enslavers to keep strict slave registers, and introduced harsh punishment in the form of physical torture and execution.

References

Slave rebellions in North America
History of Hispaniola
History of the Colony of Santo Domingo
History of the Dominican Republic
Anti-imperialism in North America
Rebellions against the Spanish Empire
16th century in the Dominican Republic
16th-century rebellions
1521 in the Spanish Empire
Slavery in the Caribbean